Julius Morgan (  – July 13, 1916) was an American criminal who was the first prisoner executed by the electric chair in Tennessee, after being convicted for the rape of a twenty-year-old woman. He claimed to have served one year in an Arkansas prison for assault before escaping to Tennessee. Morgan unsuccessfully sought clemency from the Tennessee Supreme Court and Governor Thomas Clarke Rye before admitting his guilt at his execution.

Background

Julius Morgan claimed to be twenty-two years old in 1916, and came to Tennessee from Arkansas. Morgan stated that he had been convicted for the assault of a woman in Arkansas in 1913, for which he was sentenced to two years in prison. He escaped from prison one year into his sentence, but was recaptured before escaping again and moving to Tennessee.

Morgan was working with his brother in law and uncle at a farm in Dyer County. Morgan was accused of criminally assaulting Laura Sullivan on February 1, 1916, near Dyersburg, Tennessee. The crime occurred when the woman, described in news reports as a "20 year-old white girl" who was selling "toilet articles", came to a house where Morgan was working. Morgan pursued the woman and assaulted her in the street. He was captured about twelve hours later in Maury City. The sheriff of Dyer County moved Morgan to Jackson to protect him from a mob of vigilantes who planned to lynch him.

Trial and petitions for clemency

Morgan appeared in court with three lawyers and was granted a change of venue to Memphis. On March 27, 1916, Morgan was being held in the Memphis Tennessee jail, The Memphis Tennessee Sheriff, Reichman ordered guards to protect Morgan from lynch mobs. He was convicted of the crime of rape on April 3, and a motion for a new trial was denied.

The Tennessee General Assembly passed legislation on September 27, 1913, making the electric chair the official method of execution in the state and required all executions to be held in Nashville. The legislation was signed into law by Governor Ben W. Hooper.

By June 1916 the Tennessee Supreme Court had affirmed the decision to execute Morgan. After the Supreme Court refused to overturn the death penalty, Morgan attempted to gain clemency from the governor. These attempts culminated in a visit by Governor Thomas Clarke Rye on July 10, 1916. Morgan talked to Rye about his crime, but Rye made no promise to grant clemency. Several people had asked the Governor to grant clemency including the Nashville "Colored Men's Branch of the YMCA, but the Governor did not grant clemency.

Execution
Morgan was singing songs with religious leaders before being moved to the penitentiary to await execution. At 5:00 pm on July 12, 1916, he was led to an automobile for transport while hundreds of people gathered to see him transported.

On July 13, 1916, Morgan had a last meal of watermelon at the penitentiary. Morgan's head was then shaved and he was strapped into the electric chair at 4:38 am. At 4:41 am a guard flipped the switch and sent the electricity to the chair. The first jolt of electricity did not kill Morgan and the electricity was sent to the chair a second time. Morgan was pronounced dead by a doctor at 4:45 am.

Morgan admitted to his guilt before his execution. "I was good once. Then I went to drinking bootleg whiskey and when the showdown come-it got me."

His body was delivered to his mother in Arkansas. Since his execution there have been one hundred-thirty prisoners put to death using the electric chair in Tennessee.

See also
 List of most recent executions by jurisdiction
 List of people executed in Tennessee

Notes

References

1890s births
1916 deaths
Executed African-American people
1916 crimes in the United States
20th-century executions by Tennessee
20th-century executions of American people
American people convicted of rape
People executed by Tennessee by electric chair
People executed for rape
People from Arkansas